Prabhakar Pandurang Gaonkar (4 April 1964 – 14 September 2012) was an Indian politician from Goa. He was a former member of the Goa Legislative Assembly, representing the Sanguem Assembly constituency from 1999 to 2002. He was a member of the Bharatiya Janata Party.

Early and personal life
Prabhakar Pandurang Gaonkar was born at Sanguem, Goa. He completed his Higher Secondary School Certificate. He was married to Sunanda Gaonkar, the couple had a son and daughter.

Career
Gaonkar contested in the 1999 Goa Legislative Assembly election from the Sanguem Assembly constituency on the Bharatiya Janata Party ticket and emerged victorious. He defeated Indian National Congress candidate, Satyawan Bhadru Dessai by a margin of 787 votes.

Death
Gaonkar was undergoing treatment at Kamaxi Ayurveda College and Hospital, Shiroda for the past few days. On 14 September 2012, Gaonkar died from a brief illness. His funeral rites were later held the next day.

Reactions
Then Goa chief minister, Manohar Parrikar gave his condolences and stated that Gaonkar had raised several issues that included sugarcane farmers and families displaced due to the Salaulim Dam.

Positions held
 President of Sanguem Constituency for 5 years
 Co-opted Member of Sanguem Municipal 
 Former Chairman of Industrial Development Corporation

References

1964 births
2012 deaths
Goan people
People from South Goa district
Goa MLAs 1999–2002
Bharatiya Janata Party politicians from Goa
Indian politicians